The 1960 United States presidential election in Wisconsin was held on November 8, 1960 as part of the 1960 United States presidential election. State voters chose 12 electors to the Electoral College, who voted for president and vice president.

Background
Politics in Wisconsin since the Populist movement had been dominated by the Republican Party. The Democratic Party became uncompetitive away from the Lake Michigan coast as the upper classes, along with the majority of workers who followed them, fled from William Jennings Bryan’s agrarian and free silver sympathies. Although the state did develop a strong Socialist Party to provide opposition to the GOP, Wisconsin developed the direct Republican primary in 1903 and this ultimately created competition between the “League” under Robert M. La Follette, and the conservative “Regular” faction. This ultimately would develop into the Wisconsin Progressive Party in the late 1930s, which was opposed to the conservative German Democrats and to the national Republican Party, and allied with Franklin D. Roosevelt at the federal level.

During the two wartime elections, the formerly Democratic German counties in the east of the state – which had been powerfully opposed to the Civil War because they saw it as a “Yankee” war and opposed the military draft instituted during it – viewed Communism as a much greater threat to America than Nazism and consequently opposed President Roosevelt’s war effort. Consequently, these historically Democratic counties became virtually the most Republican in the entire state, and became a major support base for populist conservative Senator Joe McCarthy, who became notorious for his investigations into Communists inside the American government. The state’s populace’s opposition to Communism and the Korean War turned Wisconsin strongly to Republican nominee Dwight D. Eisenhower in the 1952 and 1956 presidential elections.

The 1958 midterm elections, however, saw a major change in Wisconsin politics, as Gaylord A. Nelson became only the state’s second Democratic Governor since 1895, and the state also elected Democrats to the position of treasurer and Senator, besides that party gaining a majority in the State Assembly for only the second time since the middle 1890s.

Democratic primary

In the 1960 Democratic primaries, Wisconsin voted for Massachusetts Senator John F. Kennedy, due to strong support from Catholics who had recently supported Republican candidates, whilst Vice President Nixon was uncontested in the Republican primary.

The Democratic primary was covered in the documentary Primary.

Vote
In the spring, despite anti-Catholic suspicion, polls indicated that Kennedy would defeat Nixon in Wisconsin.

During the fall campaign, polls at the end of September showed the Nixon had gained, due to the religion issue and Eisenhower’s success in achieving a level of peace with the Soviet Union. The state’s Republican Party stressed achievements in peacemaking, whilst Kennedy’s October visit to the state would stress failures in the farm sector during Eisenhower’s administration. In the November election, the state fluctuated before Nixon ultimately carried Wisconsin by a relatively comfortable 3.72 point margin.

, this was the last time a Democrat won the presidency without winning Wisconsin, although the party won the popular vote without the state in 2016. This was also the last time Wisconsin would back the overall losing candidate in a presidential election until 1988.

Results

Results by county

See also
 United States presidential elections in Wisconsin

References

Wisconsin
1960
1960 Wisconsin elections